Plexiphleps is a genus of moths of the family Noctuidae. It consists of only one species Plexiphleps stellifera, which is found in Asia, from India to Taiwan.

References
Natural History Museum Lepidoptera genus database
Plexiphleps at funet

Hadeninae
Monotypic moth genera
Moths of Asia